Acona is an unincorporated community located in Holmes County, Mississippi.

History
Acona appears to be a name derived from the Choctaw language, but its meaning is uncertain. Some sources say Acona is derived from a Native American word of exclamation, similar to "whoa!" in English. A post office called Acona was established in 1852, and remained in operation until 1911. Acona was once home to a stage coach stop, tanyard, cotton gin, and millinery store.

The Acona Church, Cemetery, and School are listed on the National Register of Historic Places.

References

Unincorporated communities in Holmes County, Mississippi
Unincorporated communities in Mississippi
Mississippi placenames of Native American origin